November EP is an EP by Azure Ray. It was released January 22, 2002 on Saddle Creek Records.

Track listing

 "November"
 "For the Sake of the Song" (Townes Van Zandt)
 "No Signs of Pain"
 "Just a Faint Line"
 "I Will Do These Things"
 "Other Than This World"

External links
Azure Ray official website
Saddle Creek Records

2002 EPs
Azure Ray albums
Saddle Creek Records EPs